Walnut Creek station is an elevated Bay Area Rapid Transit (BART) station in Walnut Creek, California, served by the . The station is located north of downtown Walnut Creek, adjacent to Interstate 680 and near the Ygnacio Valley Road and California Boulevard arterial roads.

History

Walnut Creek station opened on May 21, 1973 as part of an extension from MacArthur to Concord.

Due to Walnut Creek's high ridership and large catchment area, BART proposed in 2004 that the station be the center of a transit-oriented development scheme which includes 440 residential units,  of office space,  of retail space, and 1,373 parking spaces. A parking lot on the west side of the station closed on February 3, 2018. A 900-space parking garage was constructed in its place, which allowed other parking lots to be closed for the new development. The new garage, which includes a three-lane bus plaza, opened on March 29, 2019.

Station layout
Walnut Creek station has two side platforms with two tracks. Access to the tracks is provided by a staircase, escalator, and elevator from the mezzanine, which houses nine faregates. Sustained patronage at the station has caused it to become overcrowded; BART is planning on building a second entrance, including new faregates and platform access to relieve possible emergency hazards.

The elevators to the platforms are outside of the paid area. BART plans to add a dedicated faregate for each elevator in 2022.

Bus connections

Pleasant Hill/Contra Costa Centre is a transfer point for a number of County Connection local and express routes:
Weekday: 1, 4, 5, 9, 14, 21, 93X, 95X, 96X, 98X
Weekend: 311, 321

The station is also served by  the SolTrans Solano Express Yellow Line.

All buses stop in the busway inside the south garage.

References

External links 

BART - Walnut Creek

Bay Area Rapid Transit stations in Contra Costa County, California
Stations on the Yellow Line (BART)
Walnut Creek, California
Railway stations in the United States opened in 1973